"Spitfire" is a song by the English electronic dance music group the Prodigy. It was initially released as a 12-inch vinyl record on 4 April 2005, as a digital download from iTunes the following day, and as a CD single on 11 April 2005. It was the third and last single from the album Always Outnumbered, Never Outgunned, on which it appeared as the opening track, and entered the UK Dance Chart at number one despite not charting on the all-genre UK Singles Chart. The backing vocals on "Spitfire" are performed by Juliette Lewis. The song has been included in The Sopranos, Gotham, Freddy vs. Jason, House of Wax and The Unborn soundtracks. It was previously the intro song at all of the National Hockey League's Calgary Flames home games and is also used as the ringwalk theme of boxer George Groves.

Music video
The accompanying music video is directed by Tim Qualtrough on 20 January 2005 and features digital effects blended with footage from live performances by the band. An alternate version of the music video uses clips from the film House of Wax.

Track listing
CD and 12-inch vinyl
"Spitfire" (05 Version) – 3:27
"Spitfire" (Nightbreed Mix) – 6:10
"Spitfire" (Future Funk Squad's 'Dogfight' Remix) – 7:27

There exists also "Future Funk Squad's 2011 Remix" released as free download.

Charts

References

The Prodigy songs
2005 singles
XL Recordings singles
Songs written by Liam Howlett
2004 songs